is a Japanese entrepreneur, enterprise manager, politician from Tokyo formerly belonging to Your Party until it was disbanded in December 2014. He founded The Assembly to Energize Japan in January 2015 and is the party leader.

Career 
Matsuda is founder and ex-President/CEO of Tully's Coffee Japan and ex-Member of the House of Councilors.
 
He founded Tully's Coffeein Japan after leaving Tokyo Mitsubishi UFJ Bank (former Sanwa Bank), and succeeded in growing the business to be the second largest specialty coffee chain in Japan following Starbucks Coffee Japan.

After that, he was elected as the member of the House of Councilors (Upper House of Japanese Parliament) from the electoral district of Tokyo.

Career 

1968–1986: Born in Japan, grew up in Senegal and the United States.

1986–1990: Tsukuba University

1990–1996: Banker (Sanwa→Tokyo Mitsubishi UFJ)

1997–2007: Founder and CEO of Tully's Coffee Japan

2007–2009: Tully's Coffee International, President of Quiznos Asia-Pac, AFCM

2010-    : Founded EGGS 'N THINGS JAPAN KK

2010–2016: Member of the House of Councillors of Japan. (Tokyo District)

2019-    : Founder and CEO of KooJoo Co.,Ltd

References

External links 
 

1968 births
Living people
Businesspeople from Tokyo
Businesspeople in coffee
Japanese expatriates in Senegal
Japanese chief executives
Japanese expatriates in the United States
Your Party politicians
21st-century Japanese politicians
Members of the House of Councillors (Japan)
Politicians from Tokyo
University of Tsukuba alumni